Claude le Chatellier (born 17 December 1946) is a French former cyclist. He competed in the team time trial at the 1968 Summer Olympics.

References

External links
 

1946 births
Living people
French male cyclists
Olympic cyclists of France
Cyclists at the 1968 Summer Olympics
Sportspeople from Orne
Cyclists from Normandy